The National Basketball League Coach of the Year is an annual National Basketball League (NBL) award given since the 1980 NBL season to the best head coach of the regular season. At the season's end, each club's Head Coach, one Assistant Coach and the Team Captain vote on the Coach of the Year in a 3-2-1 format (3 votes being indicative of the most deserving). Voters are not allowed to vote for the coach of their own team. The winner receives the Lindsay Gaze Trophy, which is named in honour of legendary NBL coach and Basketball Hall of Famer Lindsay Gaze, who guided the Melbourne Tigers to two NBL Championships over a long and celebrated career.

In 2015–16, Townsville Crocodiles head coach Shawn Dennis became the first coach in NBL history to be named Coach of the Year with the combination of a losing record and without qualifying for the Finals. Dr. Adrian Hurley (2005) is the only other recipient with a losing record – honoured after leading the Hunter Pirates to the Finals with a 15–17 record – while Robbie Cadee (1983) is the only other recipient to have missed the Finals – honoured after leading the Bankstown Bruins to a seventh-placed finish with a 12–10 record.

Winners

References

Coach

Basketball coaching awards
Awards established in 1980